The 2020 French motorcycle Grand Prix (officially known as the SHARK Helmets Grand Prix de France) was the tenth round of the 2020 Grand Prix motorcycle racing season, the ninth round of the 2020 MotoGP World Championship and the last race of the 2020 MotoE World Cup, which represent the end of the season for the MotoE class. It was held at the Bugatti Circuit in Le Mans on 11 October 2020.

Spaniard Jordi Torres won the MotoE World Cup in the second race.

Italian Danilo Petrucci won the MotoGP with a time of 45:54.736 on his Ducati. Notably, Spaniard Joan Mir lost his balance on entering a left turn and slid on his side for about 50 metres before managing to use the momentum as he entered the gravel pit to seamlessly regain his footing and fluidly transfer his momentum into a running action. Mir was still able to come 11th and salvage 5 points. Mir's smooth recovery became a popular internet meme in various incarnations.

Background

Impact of the COVID-19 pandemic 
The opening rounds of the 2020 championship were heavily affected by the COVID-19 pandemic. Several Grands Prix were cancelled or postponed after the aborted opening round in Qatar, prompting the Fédération Internationale de Motocyclisme to draft a new calendar. On 11 June, a new schedule based solely within Europe was announced. The French Grand Prix, originally scheduled for May 17 as the sixth Grand Prix of the season, was placed on October 11.

MotoGP Championship standings before the race 
After his victory in the Catalan Grand Prix, Fabio Quartararo climbed to the top of the drivers' standings with 108 points, 8 points ahead of Joan Mir and 18 over Maverick Viñales. Andrea Dovizioso, previous leader of the classification, due to the accident with Johann Zarco in the Catalan race, fell to fourth place with 84 points, followed by Franco Morbidelli with 77 points.

In the team championship, Petronas Yamaha SRT with 185 points leads the Suzuki Ecstar Team Championship with 160. Monster Energy Yamaha is third with 148 points, followed by the Ducati Team and Pramac Racing with 123 and 118 points respectively.

MotoGP Entrants 

 Stefan Bradl replaced Marc Márquez from the Czech Republic round onwards while he recovered from injuries sustained in his opening round crash.

Free practice

MotoGP 
The first session took place in wet conditions and saw Bradley Smith as the fastest ahead of Johann Zarco and Danilo Petrucci. The second session was held in changing and mixed conditions between wet and dry, with Jack Miller the fastest ahead of Maverick Viñales and Takaaki Nakagami. The third session had dry track conditions with Fabio Quartararo the fastest ahead of Miguel Oliveira and Franco Morbidelli.

Combined Free Practice 1-2-3 
The top ten riders (written in bold) qualified in Q2.

Personal Best lap

In the fourth session, Quartararo was the fastest ahead of Morbidelli and Viñales.

Qualifying

MotoGP

Warm-up

MotoGP 
In the warm-up, Franco Morbidelli was the fastest ahead of Maverick Viñales and Cal Crutchlow.

Race

MotoGP

Notes
  – Álex Rins is not classified due to finishing the race through pits.

Moto2

 Arón Canet suffered a broken finger in a crash during warm-up and withdrew from the event.

Moto3

MotoE

Race 1
The race, scheduled to be run for 7 laps, was red-flagged after a first-lap accident involving Mattia Casadei. The race was later restarted over 5 laps with the original starting grid.

All bikes manufactured by Energica.

Race 2

All bikes manufactured by Energica.

Championship standings after the race
Below are the standings for the top five riders, constructors, and teams after the round.

MotoGP

Riders' Championship standings

Constructors' Championship standings

Teams' Championship standings

Moto2

Riders' Championship standings

Constructors' Championship standings

Teams' Championship standings

Moto3

Riders' Championship standings

Constructors' Championship standings

Teams' Championship standings

MotoE

Notes

References

External links

France
Motorcycle Grand Prix
French motorcycle Grand Prix
French motorcycle Grand Prix